Faye Dunaway is an American actress who appeared in over seventy films, thirty television shows, thirteen plays and two music videos. Regarded as one of the greatest actresses of her generation, she was one of the leading actresses during the golden age of New Hollywood. After her film debut  The Happening, she starred in the gangster film Bonnie and Clyde, in which she was nominated for the Academy Award for Best Actress. She starred with Steve McQueen in The Thomas Crown Affair (1968) . In 1969, she co-starred with Kirk Douglas in Elia Kazan's drama The Arrangement. The following year, she starred with Dustin Hoffman in Little Big Man. In 1970, her performance in Jerry Schatzberg's experimental drama Puzzle of a Downfall Child earned her a Golden Globe nomination for Best Actress – Motion Picture Drama. She portrayed Milady de Winter in Richard Lester's The Three Musketeers (1973) and The Four Musketeers (1974).

In 1974, Dunaway starred in Roman Polanski's crime film Chinatown, in which she was nominated for the Academy Award, a Golden Globe and a BAFTA for her performance. That same year, she appeared in the all-star disaster epic The Towering Inferno. In 1975, her role in Sydney Pollack's political thriller Three Days of the Condor earned her a fourth Golden Globe nomination. Dunaway received the Academy Award for Best Actress and the Golden Globe Award for Best Actress - Motion Picture Drama for her performance in Sidney Lumet's satire Network (1976). She then starred in the thriller Eyes of Laura Mars (1978) and the drama The Champ (1979). Her controversial portrayal of Joan Crawford in the 1981 film Mommie Dearest became one of her most famous roles, but she later blamed the film for hurting her career.

She won a Golden Globe Award for Best Supporting Actress – Series, Miniseries or Television Film for her work in the miniseries Ellis Island (1985) and received critical acclaim for her performance in Barbet Schroeder's drama Barfly (1987), opposite Mickey Rourke. Her role in a 1993 episode of Columbo earned her a Primetime Emmy Award for Outstanding Guest Actress in a Drama Series. She co-starred with Johnny Depp twice, in the surrealist comedy-drama Arizona Dream (1993) and the romantic comedy Don Juan DeMarco (1995). Her portrayal of Wilhelmina Cooper in the drama Gia (1998) with Angelina Jolie earned her a third Golden Globe Award, for Best Supporting Actress – Series, Miniseries or Television. Dunaway also appeared in the James Gray-directed crime film The Yards (2000) and Roger Avary's satirical black comedy The Rules of Attraction (2002).

Dunaway started her acting career on Broadway and appeared in several plays throughout her career, including A Man for All Seasons (1961–63), After the Fall (1964), Hogan's Goat (1965–67) and A Streetcar Named Desire (1973). She was awarded the Sarah Siddons Award for her portrayal of opera singer Maria Callas in Master Class (1996). Dunaway also appeared in two music videos, Tom Petty and the Heartbreakers' Into the Great Wide Open in 1991 and Hill Zaini's I Heard in 2010.

Film

Television

Theatre

Music video appearances

References

Citations

Bibliography

External links 

 
 
 
 

Dunaway, Faye
Dunaway, Faye